A Winter in Majorca (whose original title in French is Un hiver à Majorque) is an autobiographical travel novel written by George Sand, at the time in a relationship with Frédéric Chopin.  Although published in 1842, it appeared for the first time in 1841 in the Revue des deux Mondes.

In it, Sand relates the details of her trip and stay with Chopin on the island of Majorca, due to the illness of the pianist. Sand, Chopin, and Sand's two children stayed in the charterhouse of Valldemossa for a few months, from the end of 1838 until February 1839, during which time they hoped that Chopin's tuberculosis would improve. However, the winter was hard and his health did not improve and so they quickly returned to Barcelona and eventually to Marseille and then Paris.

Summary: an uninhabited island 
Consistent with her male pen name identity, Sand portrays the entire visit as if she were a male friend of Chopin's. In winter of 1838, the author takes the boat to Majorca, and docks at Palma. His children and Frédéric Chopin, seriously ill, accompany him.

He had to stay in the city, then at the Carthusian monastery of Valldemossa. The food is expensive, includes a lot (too much) of pig and the peasants are as unpleasant as dishonest. The smell of bad olive oil stinks.

The author discovers and recognizes the architectural and natural beauties of the island, which is however not always as in the books read before the departure.

The author postulates that:

assumes the absence of any "intellectual life" in the Majorcan.

Moreover, the latter would be, by essence and culture, deeply lazy: 

Agriculture is no less backward there than in some French regions, but, for George Sand, the Majorcan peasant is incredibly poorly built, soft and slow:

In the spring of 1839, it is the return, inevitably liberating, for France.

A beautiful island with wild landscapes of the most magnificent where one crosses some charming people, but generally very badly inhabited and especially badly managed, endowed with agriculture practiced too slowly and with a network of rustic roads, insufficient in the countryside and impracticable under the rain. A population deprived of any intellectual life which takes pleasure in its ignorance : here is, in short, what George Sand retains and gives to see of Majorca.

See also 
George Sand
Frédéric Chopin
Valldemossa Charterhouse

References

Sources 
 
 
 

1842 French novels
Novels by George Sand
French autobiographies
Love stories
French travel books